Orleans Jr. Sr. High School is a public high school in Orleans, Indiana.

History
Orleans High School was organized in 1866. Its first graduating class was in 1872.

Curriculum
Orleans High School offers a comprehensive college-preparatory curriculum. Vocational courses at the Bedford Career Center and the Lost River Career Co-op are available to students in grades 11 and 12.

Extracurricular activities

Athletics
The school's teams, known as the Orleans Bulldogs, compete in Indiana High School Athletic Association size classification A in the Patoka Lake Conference. Teams are fielded in baseball, basketball, cross country, golf, softball, track, and volleyball. In boys basketball, after 11 years with the program, the current record for Coach Bradley stands at 198 wins and 71 losses. This brings him to an impressive win percentage of 74%.  During his time at the school, Coach Bradley has led the boys to multiple Sectional championships.  In boys baseball, Coach Wheeler has led to Bulldogs to a number of IHSAA Class A Sectional victories, as well as one Regional title in 2006, the farthest any team in school history has gone in the state tournament.

Band
The Orleans Jr. Sr. High school marching band is called the Orleans Bulldog Regiment. The band competes in the Indiana ISSMA in Class D. They have made it to state four times. In 1992, they received 10th place. In 1998, they received 3rd place. In 1999, they received 2nd place. The band returned to state in 2010, placing 10th in Class D. The Orleans Bulldog Regiment has also hosted The Orleans Pep Band Invitational since 2008.

Academic Super Bowl
The Orleans High School academic team won state championship banners in the Indiana Academic Super Bowl in 2004 (Fine Arts), 2006 (Interdisciplinary), 2009 (Fine Arts), 2011 (English, Fine Arts, Social Studies), 2012 (Social Studies), 2015 (English, Fine Arts), 2016 (Social Studies), and 2017 (Fine Arts, Social Studies).
Thirty-two Orleans academic squads earned state finalist honors in 1997,1999-2007,2009-2012, 2014, 2015, and 2017. The Orleans team has won the Patoka Lake Academic Conference Invitational eleven of the past twelve years (2006-2017).
Orleans High School academic coaches, Kristina Hole and Leah Morgan, were honored in 2014 with the Dick Ramey Above and Beyond Award by the Indiana Association of School Principals.

See also
 List of high schools in Indiana

References

External links
Orleans High School
Orleans Bulldog Regiment bands

Educational institutions established in 1866
Public high schools in Indiana
High schools in Southwestern Indiana
1866 establishments in Indiana
Education in Orange County, Indiana